José Mayobanex Fernández Rojas (born November 2, 1974) is a retired third baseman in Major League Baseball, the KBO League, Nippon Professional Baseball (NPB), and the Dominican Winter Baseball League. He played eleven years in the NPB, compiling a .282 batting average with 206 home runs and 772 runs batted in.

Fernández played briefly in Major League Baseball for the Montreal Expos and the Anaheim Angels. He just hit .143 in 49 at-bats during his MLB career.

After a successful season in Korea in 2002 with the SK Wyverns, in 2003 Fernández came to Japan to play Nippon Professional Baseball. He played one season for the Chiba Lotte Marines in 2003, and then two seasons for the Seibu Lions in 2004–2005. Fernández was a key member of the 2004 Japan Series-champion Lions team. 

Moving to the Tohoku Rakuten Golden Eagles, he played for that team for three seasons, in 2006–2008. While playing for the Golden Eagles, he was a Pacific League Best Nine Award-winner at third base in 2006. On April 1, 2007, Fernández and Takeshi Yamasaki hit grand slams in the same inning for the Golden Eagles. Fernández led the Golden Eagles in RBI in 2008, with 99.

Fernández played for the champion Dominican Republic national baseball team in the 2007 Caribbean Series.

Fernández played for the Orix Buffaloes in 2009 and then returned to the Saitama Seibu Lions franchise for 2010–2011. He returned to the Golden Eagles in 2012, and then returned to the Buffaloes for his final season, 2013.

After briefly playing in Mexican League for the Tigres de Quintana Roo in 2010, Fernández was signed by the Seibu Lions on a ¥30million deal to the end of the season.

External links

, or NPB

1974 births
Living people
Acereros de Monclova players
Águilas Cibaeñas players
Anaheim Angels players
Chiba Lotte Marines players
Dominican Republic expatriate baseball players in Canada
Dominican Republic expatriate baseball players in Japan
Dominican Republic expatriate baseball players in Mexico
Dominican Republic expatriate baseball players in South Korea
Dominican Republic expatriate baseball players in the United States
Delmarva Shorebirds players
Gulf Coast Expos players
Harrisburg Senators players
Indianapolis Indians players
KBO League infielders
Major League Baseball players from the Dominican Republic
Major League Baseball third basemen
Mexican League baseball first basemen
Montreal Expos players
Nippon Professional Baseball designated hitters
Nippon Professional Baseball first basemen
Nippon Professional Baseball third basemen
Orix Buffaloes players
Ottawa Lynx players
People from La Vega Province
Saitama Seibu Lions players
Salt Lake Stingers players
Seibu Lions players
SSG Landers players
Tigres de Quintana Roo players
Tohoku Rakuten Golden Eagles players
Vermont Expos players
West Palm Beach Expos players